Ann Carter (died 1629, formerly Ann Barrington) was an English activist from Maldon, Essex, who was executed for her part in leading food protests in 1629. She used the title "captain", and was hanged on 30 May 1629.

Maldon brewery Farmer's Ales has named a beer "Captain Ann" in her honour.

References

Year of birth missing
1629 deaths
People from Maldon, Essex
People executed by the Kingdom of England by hanging
Executed English women
Executed people from Essex
People executed by Stuart England